The Bob Dylan and the Grateful Dead 1987 Tour was a concert tour by Bob Dylan and the Grateful Dead taking place in the summer of 1987 and consisting of six concerts.  Each concert began with one or two lengthy sets by the Grateful Dead of their own material (sometime broken into a first and second set, per the Dead's usual practice), followed by a roughly 90 minute set of the Dead acting as Dylan's backup band.

Tour dates

Personnel
Bob Dylan — vocals, guitar
Jerry Garcia — lead guitar, backing vocals
Bob Weir — guitar, backing vocals
Brent Mydland — keyboards, backing vocals
Phil Lesh — bass, backing vocals
Mickey Hart — drums
Bill Kreutzmann —drums

Recordings
Dylan & the Dead is a live album released by Bob Dylan and the Grateful Dead in February 1989 by Columbia Records. It consists of seven songs written and sung by Dylan, with the Dead providing accompaniment taken from the Dylan and the Grateful Dead 1987 Tour. Songs from two of the Grateful Dead performances were released on their album View from the Vault, Volume Four.

References

1987 concert tours
Bob Dylan concert tours
Co-headlining concert tours